Rajendra Kumar Acharya, is a district judge and former Director of Judgement Execution Directorate, Supreme Court of Nepal.

Early life
Acharya passed S.L.C from a public school at Suryathum, Arghakhanchi.

He has completed his PhD from Allahabad University in the Law of Tort.

Writer
His article are widely published in local, and national dailies of Nepal like Kantipur, Rajdhani, Annapurna Post and so on. He is Writer of various Books as-
1- Civitas Juriprudencia
2- Crime Investigation
3- Bhakti Aakura (Collection of Divine Poems)
4- Shabdha Banna Darayaka Akshrharu (Collection of various Poems)
5- Commentary on Motor Vehicle and Transport Management Act 2049 Bs.
6- Badi (Novel)
7- Hatkadi (Novel)
8- The Law of Tort

EU Controversy 
In 2017 legislative election, Acharya complained Election Commission seeking to ban three European Union observers from monitoring the upcoming provincial and parliamentary polls in violation of the election code of conduct. The observers went to Kanchanpur District Court, without any prior permission, to enquire about human resources available in the court, which was beyond their jurisdiction. Later, Election Commission barred the European Union observers from monitoring the election. However, European Union Election Observation Mission (EU EOM) dismissed this charges.

References

External links
 News on Rajendra Kumar Acharya, Published in Kantipur Daily
 Article in Nepali, Published in Kantipur Daily: Pidit le K Paye

21st-century Nepalese judges
Living people
University of Allahabad alumni
Year of birth missing (living people)